The 1891 Iowa Hawkeyes football team represented the University of Iowa during the 1891 college football season. It ended in controversy. Following an argument where Kansas argued that Iowa had not put the ball into play fairly, the Jayhawks left the field claiming a 14–12 victory. However, the game was not called until after the next play, when Iowa scored an uncontested touchdown. Today, Iowa lists the game as an 18–14 Hawkeye victory.

Earlier in the year, two firsts were established in Hawkeye football history. On November 2, the Hawkeyes played rival Minnesota for the first of many times in school history. Later, on November 26, the Hawkeyes played their first game outside the state of Iowa in a win against Nebraska. The game was played in Omaha, Nebraska.

Schedule

‡ The outcome of this game is disputed (see above).

References

Sources
 MacCambridge, M. (2005) ESPN College Football Encyclopedia. New York: ESPN Books. .
 Lamb, D. and McGrane, B. (1964) 75 Years with the Fighting Hawkeyes. WM. C. Brown Company. 

Iowa
Iowa Hawkeyes football seasons
Iowa Hawkeyes football